The Pashtoons Social Democratic Party (abbr. PSDP) is the unity and independence party of all Pashtuns, a social democratic political party in Afghanistan and Pakistan.

The party was founded in February 1981 by Kabir Stori, a German-educated Afghan intellectual from Kunar, who was a follower of the non-violent philosophy of Khan Abdul Ghaffar Khan for national unity, independence and the well-being of the entire Pashtun Nation.  The party does not recognize the Durand Line and believes in the Greater ("Loy") Afghanistan, a union of Afghanistan and the Pashtun-majority parts of Pakistan.

References
Pashtoonkhwa.com Status of PSDP.
TalAfghan Political Parties in Afghanistan.

External links

Nationalist parties in Afghanistan
Political parties in Afghanistan
Political parties established in 1981
1981 in Afghanistan
1981 establishments in Afghanistan
Secularism in Afghanistan
Social democratic parties
Pashtun nationalism
Social democratic parties in Asia